Mathias Sandorf is a 1921 French historical adventure film directed by Henri Fescourt and starring Romuald Joubé, Yvette Andréyor and Jean Toulout. It is an adaptation of the 1885 novel Mathias Sandorf by Jules Verne. A later sound version of the story Mathias Sandorf was released in 1963.
The film was distributed in America by Pathe Exchange under the alternative title The Isle of Zorda.

Some scenes were shot around Nice on the French Riviera.

Cast
 Romuald Joubé as Mathias Sandorf
 Yvette Andréyor as Sava Toronthal
 Jean Toulout as Silas Toronthal
 Paul Vermoyal as Sarcany
 Gaston Modot as Carpéna
 Armand Tallier as Pierre Bathory
 Armand Dutertre as Birik
 Henri Maillard as Ferrato
 Gabrielle Ristori as Maria Ferrato
 Mario Nasthasio as Zirone
 Djemil Anik as Nasmir
 Germaine Pelisse as Mme. Toronthal
 Adeline de La Croix as Mme. Bathory 
 Darnay as Étienne Bathory
 Benvenuto Nardo as Pescade
 Milo Poggi as Matifou

References

Bibliography 
 Geoffrey Nowell-Smith. The Oxford History of World Cinema. Oxford University Press, 1996.

External links 
 

1921 films
French silent films
1920s French-language films
Films directed by Henri Fescourt
French black-and-white films
1920s historical adventure films
Films based on Mathias Sandorf
French historical adventure films
1920s French films
1920s Italian films
Silent historical adventure films